"Hey You" is a song by the English hard rock band the Quireboys, released as a single on 25 December 1989. Although their first three singles were not significant hits in the UK, "Hey You" became the band's highest-charting song on the UK Singles Chart, peaking at number 14 in January 1990. After that, the band managed to get all but two singles into the top 40.

Charts

References

1989 singles
1989 songs
1990 singles
The Quireboys songs